Stanley Unwin may refer to:
 Stanley Unwin (comedian) (1911–2002), South African-born comedic writer and performer
 Stanley Unwin (publisher) (1884–1968), British publisher, founder of George Allen and Unwin